John Morin Scott (October 25, 1789 – April 3, 1858) was an American lawyer and politician who served as mayor of Philadelphia from 1841 to 1844. During his administration, the 1842 Lombard Street riot and the 1844 Philadelphia Nativist Riots occurred. He was a member of the Whig Party. He attended Princeton University, from which he graduated in 1805. He married Mary Emlen on May 15, 1817.

He was a trustee of Lafayette College from 1826 to 1847.

He died on April 3, 1858, in Philadelphia and was interred at Laurel Hill Cemetery.

References

External links

1789 births
1858 deaths
19th-century American politicians
Burials at Laurel Hill Cemetery (Philadelphia)
Lafayette College trustees
Lawyers from New York City
Mayors of Philadelphia
Pennsylvania lawyers
Pennsylvania Whigs
Princeton University alumni
19th-century American lawyers